Cher Antoine ou l'Amour raté is a play in four acts by French dramatist Jean Anouilh. It was written and first produced in Paris in 1969 in a production that was co-directed by the author.

Synopsis
The play takes place in Bavaria in 1913.  Antoine was a  famous playwright and director, who died in his castle in Bavaria where he had retired. (He killed himself accidentally while cleaning his gun.) The important people in his life, including his ex-wives, all came to the castle for a reading of his last will and testament. They were all trapped by an avalanche, and had to stay in the castle until the road would be cleared. Antoine had organized this gathering in detail, and had even written a play about it.

Original cast
 Jacques François: Antoine
 Claude Nicot: Cravatar
 Hubert Deschamps: Marcellin
 Pierre Bertin: hare foot
 Joseph Falcucci: Alexandre
 Francine Bergé: Estelle
 Françoise Rosay: Carlotta
 Nelly Benedetti: Valérie
 Uta Taeger: Anemone
 Madeleine Ozeray: Gabrielle
 Édith Scob: Maria
 Madeleine Suffel: Frida
 Roland Pietri: The German notary
 The actors, played by different characters
 Alexis, mute character, played by Alexander
 A small German valet, mute character
 The consul of France, invisible character

Film adaptation
The 2012 film, You Ain't Seen Nothin' Yet!, directed by Alain Resnais, is a loose adaptation of Dear Antoine, or the Love that Failed.  Resnais and Anouilh had worked together on a number of plays.

References

Plays by Jean Anouilh
1969 plays